Lamesa is a city in and the county seat of Dawson County, Texas, United States. The population was 8,674 at the 2020 census, down from 9,952 at the 2000 census. Located south of Lubbock on the Llano Estacado, Lamesa was founded in 1903. Most of its economy is based on  cotton farming. The Preston E. Smith prison unit, named for the former governor of Texas, is located just outside Lamesa.

Geography

Lamesa is located in the center of Dawson County at  (32.734439, –101.958190). U.S. Highway 87 (Lynn Avenue) passes through the eastern side of the city, leading north  to Lubbock and southeast  to Big Spring. U.S. Highway 180 passes through the center of town as 4th Street and leads west  to Seminole and east  to Snyder. Texas State Highway 137 passes through the city as Bryan Avenue and leads northwest  to Brownfield and south  to Stanton. Texas State Highway 349 branches off Highway 137 south of Lamesa and leads southwest  to Midland.

Demographics

2020 census

As of the 2020 United States census, there were 8,674 people, 3,705 households, and 2,267 families residing in the city. The median income for a household in the city was $36,904. The per capita income for the city was $22,062. 29.4% of the population was recorded as living below the poverty line.

2000 Census 
As of the census of 2000, 9,952 people, 3,696 households, and 2,679 families resided in the city. The population density was 2,080.8 people per square mile (803.9/km). The 4,270 housing units averaged 892.8 per square mile (344.9/km). The racial makeup of the city was 41.9% White non-Hispanic, 4.2% African American, 0.7% Native American, 0.19% Asian, 19.51% from other races, and 2.13% from two or more races. Hispanics or Latinos of any race were 52.96% of the population.

Of the 3,696 households, 34.4% had children under the age of 18 living with them, 56.5% were married couples living together, 12.2% had a female householder with no husband present, and 27.5% were not families. About 25.5% of all households were made up of individuals, and 14.6% had someone living alone who was 65 years of age or older. The average household size was 2.66 and the average family size was 3.20.

In the city, the population was distributed as 29.7% under the age of 18, 8.0% from 18 to 24, 24.4% from 25 to 44, 20.4% from 45 to 64, and 17.4% who were 65 years of age or older. The median age was 36 years. For every 100 females, there were 90.1 males. For every 100 females age 18 and over, there were 83.3 males.

The median income for a household in the city was $27,362, and for a family was $31,556. Males had a median income of $26,393 versus $16,826 for females. The per capita income for the city was $16,211. About 18.1% of families and 21.9% of the population were below the poverty line, including 33.4% of those under age 18 and 12.9% of those age 65 or over.

Notable people

Barry Corbin, actor
Steve Freeman, former Buffalo Bills defensive back and NFL referee
V. O. Key, Jr., political scientist
Lynn Morris, bluegrass musician
Steve Pearce, Former U.S. Representative from New Mexico
Bo Robinson, NFL player
Preston Smith, Governor of Texas
Jerry Taff, journalist
Don Walser, country musician

Education
Lamesa is served by the Lamesa Independent School District, which includes Lamesa High School and Lamesa Middle School, whose school mascots are the Golden Tornadoes.

A branch of Howard College, a community college in Big Spring, is located in Lamesa.

Culture

During the last weekend of April, Lamesa hosts the annual Chicken Fried Steak Festival. Lamesa has been called "the birthplace of the chicken-fried steak", but the reporter who made the designation later confessed that the claim is fictional. Nevertheless, in 2011, Governor Rick Perry declared Lamesa the home of the chicken-fried steak. In the 2013 competition, Mayor Dave Nix teamed with city councilman Greg Hughes as contestants. The community event attracted 65 sponsors and 104 booths.

La Entrada al Pacifico is an international trade corridor that begins in Topolobampo, Mexico, runs through Midland-Odessa and ends in Lamesa (according to the legal definition).

Lamesa's Sky-Vue Drive-In Theater, established in 1948, became a well-known regional fixture. It has been closed since a kitchen fire destroyed the snack bar on November 27, 2015. Known for its "Chihuahua sandwich", conceived by owners R. A. "Skeet" Noret and his wife, Sarah, the Sky-Vue was one of only 14 remaining drive-in theaters in Texas. Others are in Lubbock and Clarendon. Before he became famous, musician Buddy Holly performed on the roof of the Sky Vue's projector building. The theater was also used as cover art and named in the title of country music album Down at the Sky-Vue Drive-In by country music artist Don Walser. Lamesa also has an indoor movie theater, Movieland, which has two screens.

"The Wall" on S 2nd Street is a brick wall on which graduating seniors of Lamesa High School paint their names. Each year, the new graduating class adds their own graffiti on top of the last.

The CBS television series Dallas had one of its more profitable oil wells, Ewing 23, in Lamesa. In one of the more dramatic scenes of the series, in season four, J. R. Ewing flies in his Learjet to the Lamesa airport. Shortly thereafter, gunfire erupts and Dawson County sheriff's deputies shoot a man who blew up the oilfield after a failed effort to blackmail Ewing.

Dal Paso Museum
The Dal Paso Museum, a collection of local artifacts housed in a former hotel, is located in downtown Lamesa. The name is derived from the fact that Lamesa is located on the table land of the Staked Plains. On display are home furnishings, pioneer tools, ranch and farm equipment, and exhibits by local artists. The museum, at 306 South First Street, has limited afternoon hours to the public.

Media
The city is served by a biweekly newspaper, The Lamesa Press Reporter. Local radio station KPET (AM 690) broadcasts local news, call-in shows, and country music, in addition to sporting events from the hometown Golden Tornadoes, the Red Raiders, and the Texas Rangers. Other radio stations include KBKN (FM) and KVLM (FM). The cable TV system is operated by Northland Cable Television. Other signals are received from stations in Lubbock, Midland-Odessa, and other area towns. Television signals are provided by ABC, CBS, NBC, PBS, Fox, Telemundo and CW stations in Lubbock and the Univision station in the Permian Basin (Midland-Odessa).

Climate

According to the Köppen climate classification system, Lamesa has a semiarid climate, BSk on climate maps. The town is known for hot summers—frequently topping —and cold winter nights (where the temperature goes below freezing on an average of 91 nights).

Photo gallery

References

External links

 Official city website

Cities in Dawson County, Texas
Cities in Texas
County seats in Texas
Micropolitan areas of Texas